Anam Ramanarayana Reddy (born 10 July 1952) is a politician in India. In 2012, he was the Finance and Planning Minister for the state of Andhra Pradesh, with a seat in the cabinet of the government led by Nallari Kiran Kumar Reddy. He joined YSR Congress Party in 2018.

Early life
Ramanarayana Reddy Anam was born in Nellore to Venkata Reddy Anam. He is the brother of Anam Vivekananda Reddy who was also a politician. He was educated at St.Joseph's English Medium High School and was awarded B.Com and B.L. degrees from Andhra University.

Career
Reddy was twice elected to the Legislative Assembly of Andhra Pradesh from the Rapur constituency in Nellore district. On both occasions he was a candidate of the Telugu Desam Party. He served as Minister for Roads and Buildings in the cabinet of N. T. Rama Rao.

He joined the Indian National Congress (INC) in 1991 and, as a consequence of delimitation coming into force, he switched to the Atmakur Assembly constituency for the 2009 state assembly elections. He was again elected.

Between 2007 and 2009, Reddy was State Minister for Information and Public Relations in the government of Y. S. Rajasekhara Reddy. By July 2009 he had been appointed State Minister for Municipal Administration and Urban Development.

In 2012, Anam Ramanarayana Reddy was the State Minister for Finance and Planning in the government of Kiran Kumar Reddy.

In 2018, he left Telugu Desam Party and joined YSR Congress Party in the presence of YS Jagan Mohan Reddy.

References

External links

1952 births
Living people
Indian National Congress politicians from Andhra Pradesh
Telugu Desam Party politicians
People from Nellore
Telugu politicians
Andhra Pradesh MLAs 2019–2024